Slim River (Jawi: سليم ريۏر; ; Tamil: சிலிம் ரீவர்) is a small town in Muallim District, Perak, Malaysia. It is about 100 km (driving time 45 minutes) from Kuala Lumpur. It is situated in the southern part of Perak and is 20 km north of Tanjung Malim. It is about 100 km (driving time 1 hour) from Ipoh. The town is surrounded by many small villages.

History
The town is named after a nearby river, Sungai Slim. The word Sungai means river in Malay. The river was actually named after an English captain with last name Slim in the 19th century. He accidentally went up the river instead of the Perak River which was the main waterway back then.

Slim River was a military strategic midpoint from North to South of Malaya during World War II. It was the site of a major battle during World War II between the Japanese and British forces which consisted of troops from India, Australia and Great Britain. The British lost the Battle of Slim River to the Japanese forces, who were equipped with tanks. The Japanese also had total air superiority. In their defeat at Slim River, the British suffered heavy casualties and many units were cut off from their line of retreat. The battle effectively ended British hopes of defending Malaya.

Economy
The main economic activities are agriculture-based, such as palm oil and rubber plantations. There are some automotive shops selling engine parts and components. This is due to the proximity of the new car manufacturing town, Proton City in Tanjung Malim.

Demographics
The population is estimated at 100,000, and comprises Malays, Chinese, Tamils (Indians) and Aborigines (Orang Asli)

Public Amenities
There is a new modern government hospital providing basic medical care for the district. In addition, there is a public library for the locals to visit.

Schools
Primary and secondary education are provided by a few schools in Slim River, namely:
Sekolah Kebangsaan Balun, Slim River
Sekolah Menengah Kebangsaan Dato' Zulkifli Muhammad
Sekolah Menengah Kebangsaan Slim
Sekolah Kebangsaan Kuala Slim
Kolej Vokasional Slim River
Sekolah Kebangsaan Slim River
Sekolah Kebangsaan Aminuddin Baki
Sekolah Rendah Jenis Kebangsaan (C) Chin Hua
Sekolah Menengah Kebangsaan Agama Slim River
Sekolah Rendah Jenis Kebangsaan (T) Slim River
Sekolah Kebangsaan Slim Village
Sekolah Kebangsaan Ulu Slim
Sekolah Kebangsaan Pos Bersih
Sekolah Kebangsaan Pos Tenau
Sekolah Jenis Kebangsaan (C) Ho Pin, Slim Village
Sekolah Jenis Kebangsaan (T) Slim Village
Sekolah Jenis Kebangsaan (T)LADANG CLUNY

Places of interest
The waterfall at Sungai Bil is famous among the locals for a weekend getaway. Recreation activities and camping is possible, and one can travel from the town by road within 30 minutes. Food stalls selling lunch and fast food are available normally during weekend.

There is also an open wet market every Sunday morning until noon, where one can try a variety of local dishes and delicacies.

At Ulu Slim, about the same distance from Slim River to Sungai Bil, there is a hot spring, and it is expected that the local government will develop the place, into a recreation area, for families. The hot spring water is 104 °C and is reputed to be the 5th hottest hot spring in the world.

Several outdoor extreme sports are available inside Ulu Slim, reservation will be required for these activities such as white water rafting, 4x4 rides, camping, and jungle trekking.

The upcoming Slim River Water Theme Park will also be opened soon.

Transportation

It is accessible by road from the capital city, Kuala Lumpur (100 km) or by train (Slim River railway station). The main trunk road to Tanjung Malim was the first ever toll road in Malaysia and was eventually given free access to the public in the mid 1980s.

Before the construction of North–South Expressway, all traffic going to destinations in the northern states of Peninsular Malaysia, such as Kedah, Perlis and Penang would pass through the town of Slim River. With the new North–South Expressway bypassing smaller towns, fewer people, traffic, and tourists pass through Slim River. Currently, the economy of Slim River is improving due to the nearby Proton City, located in Tanjung Malim.

References
Lata Sungai Bil
Far-Eastern-Heroes: Slim River

Muallim District
Towns in Perak